Dichorda rectaria is a species of emerald moth in the family Geometridae. It is found in North America.

The MONA or Hodges number for Dichorda rectaria is 7056.

Subspecies
These two subspecies belong to the species Dichorda rectaria:
 Dichorda rectaria cockerelli Sperry, 1939
 Dichorda rectaria rectaria

References

Further reading

 

Geometrinae
Articles created by Qbugbot
Moths described in 1877